Brad Nimmo (born 3 February 1959) is a former Australian rules footballer who played for North Melbourne in the Victorian Football League (VFL) during the early 1980s.

Nimmo spent two seasons playing at North Melbourne, after a stint in the Essendon reserves, but is best remembered for his 154-game career with Coburg in the Victorian Football Association, which he captained from 1987 to 1991. This included back to back premierships in 1988 and 1989, under coach Phil Cleary. He was later named as the captain and centre half back in Coburg's official 'Team of the Century'.

References

Holmesby, Russell and Main, Jim (2007). The Encyclopedia of AFL Footballers. 7th ed. Melbourne: Bas Publishing.

1959 births
Living people
North Melbourne Football Club players
Coburg Football Club players
Australian rules footballers from Victoria (Australia)